"If You Think You Know How to Love Me" is a song by British rock band Smokie. It was first released in June 1975 as a single and appeared later on the album Changing All the Time. Like the band's first single "Pass It Around", the song was composed by Nicky Chinn and Mike Chapman.

Upon its release, "If You Think You Know How to Love Me" became a chart success all over Europe, peaking at No. 2 in Ireland, No. 3 in Sweden, No. 6 in Norway, No. 8 in Germany and No. 15 in the Netherlands. It took six weeks for the song to debut in the UK Singles Chart on 19 July 1975. After a few days, Smokie appeared on BBC show Top of the Pops, and this helped the song to climb the charts. The single eventually peaked at No. 3 on the UK charts, during a nine-week stay on that chart.

A second version of the song was included in the 1988 album All Fired Up, sung by Alan Barton. The original 1975 version was sung by Chris Norman.

Pat Benatar recorded the song in 1979 for her debut album In the Heat of the Night, released as the second single from that album in October 1979.

Track listing

Chart history

Weekly charts

Year-end charts

References

External links
Smokie discography 1975-1982

Smokie (band) songs
1975 singles
Songs written by Nicky Chinn
Songs written by Mike Chapman
Song recordings produced by Mike Chapman
Jim Capaldi songs
Rex Smith songs
1975 songs
RAK Records singles